Anoratha costalis is a moth of the family Erebidae first described by Frederic Moore in 1867. It is found in northern India.

The wingspan is 52–54 mm. The forewings have a dark reddish-brown ground colour. The species exhibits sexual dimorphism in both shape and colour. Males have narrower wings and a relatively straight outer margin forming a sharp and fine pointed apex. The forewings of the females are broader. The apex is also fine pointed, but the outer margin is curved outwards. Females are dark, chocolate brown with an ivory coloured costal line. Males are paler and brighter reddish brown and show a slightly whitish marked costal line.

References

Moths described in 1867
Hypeninae
Moths of Asia